North Derby is an unincorporated community in the town of Derby, Orleans County, Vermont, United States.

Notes

Unincorporated communities in Orleans County, Vermont
Unincorporated communities in Vermont